Port Orford Heads State Park is a coastal state park in northwest Curry County, Oregon, United States, in the city of Port Orford.  Established in 1976, it is administered by the Oregon Parks and Recreation Department.

Location
Located on a bluff above the city, the park has three main walking trails:  the Cove, Tower and Headland trails.  From each of these vantage points (at the right time of year) one can see commercial fishing boats, orcas, gray whales, California and Steller's sea lions, and various seabirds.  The Headland Trail offers an unrestricted view of Cape Blanco to the north and is a popular whale watching spot during the fall.  The park is open for day use only.

History
From 1934 to 1970, one of the earliest US Coast Guard lifeboat stations on the Oregon Coast operated at what later became the park.

Lifeboat Station Museum
The Port Orford Lifeboat Station is a museum and interpretive center that was opened in 2000 by the Point Orford Heritage Society.  Built in 1934, the building is on the National Register of Historic Places (as the Port Orford Coast Guard Station) and was used by the U.S. Coast Guard until 1970.  The museum includes the station's refurbished, unsinkable  motor life boat, and information about the Japanese bombing of the south Oregon coast during World War II.

See also
 List of Oregon State Parks

References

External links
 
 

State parks of Oregon
Oregon Coast
Parks in Curry County, Oregon
Headlands of Oregon
United States Coast Guard stations
1976 establishments in Oregon
Landforms of Curry County, Oregon
Port Orford, Oregon